The 1930 United States Senate election in Minnesota was held on Tuesday November 4, Incumbent Senator Thomas D. Schal defeated Einar Hoidale of the Minnesota Democratic Party and Forner United States Representative Ernest Lundeen of the Farmer–Labor Party of Minnesota to win a second term.

Farmer–Labor primary

Candidates

Declared
 Ernest Lundeen, Former U.S. Representative from Minnesota's 5th congressional district (1917-1919), attorney from Minneapolis, former state Representative from the 42nd House District (1911-1915), Republican candidate for the 5th CD in 1914, 1918, 1920, independent candidate for the 5th CD in 1920, Republican candidate for U.S. Senate in 1922 and 1923, candidate Chief Justice of the Minnesota Supreme Court in 1924, Farmer-Labor nominee for Minnesota's 10th Congressional District in 1926, Farmer-Labor nominee for the 5th CD  in 1929
 Knud Wefald, Former Republican state Representative from the 60th House District (1913-1915) and 49th House District (1915-1917), former Farmer-Labor U.S. Representative from Minnesota's 9th congressional district (1923-1927), resident of Moorhead

Results

Republican primary

Candidates

Declared
 Theodore Christianson, 21st Governor of Minnesota since 1925, owner and publisher of the Dawson Sentinel, former president of the Dawson Village Council (1910-1911), state Representative from the 24th House District (1915-1925)
 Thomas D. Schall, Incumbent U.S. Senator since 1925
 John F. Selb, Former State Representative from the 35th House District (1905-1907; 1909-1911), former registrar of the Railroad and Warehouse Commission, Minneapolis attorney

Results

General election

Candidates

Communist 

 Rudolph Harju, Resident of New York Mills, nominated by petition

Democratic 

 Einar Hoidale, Attorney from Minneapolis, former prosecuting attorney of Brown County (1900-1906), former judge advocate of the state militia (1900-1908), Democratic candidate for Minnesota's 5th Congressional District CD in 1910 and 1912, Democratic nominee for the 5th CD in 1929

Independent 

 Charles A. Lund, Banker and attorney from Vining, state Senator from the 50th Senate District (1923-1931), Republican candidate for Treasurer in 1920, Republican candidate for Lieutenant Governor in 1930

Results

See also 
 United States Senate elections, 1930 and 1931

References

Minnesota
1930
1930 Minnesota elections